Burlington Heights may refer to:

Burlington Heights, New Jersey, United States.
Burlington Heights (Ontario), Canada.
Burlington Heights, Cleveland, United States.